Capula is a genus of leaf beetles in the family Chrysomelidae. It contains three species distributed in western China. It is a member of the section "Capulites" in the tribe Hylaspini of the subfamily Galerucinae, alongside Furusawaia (including Yunnaniata), Nepalogaleruca and Himaplosonyx. All species in Capula are wingless, a character shared by the other genera in the section Capulites.

Species
The genus contains three species:
 Capula apicalis Chen, Wang & Jiang, 1986 – Sichuan
 Capula caudata Chen, Wang & Jiang, 1986 – Sichuan
 Capula metallica Jacobson, 1925 – Qinghai, Sichuan, Tibet

References

External links

 
 Capula at insectoid.info

Chrysomelidae genera
Galerucinae
Beetles of Asia
Taxa named by Georgiy Jacobson
Wingless beetles
Insects of China